Brickellia betonicifolia, the betonyleaf brickellbush, is a Mexican species of flowering plants in the family Asteraceae. It is native to northwestern Mexico, in the States of Baja California, Sonora, Chihuahua, and Durango and the southwestern United States (New Mexico and Arizona).

Brickellia betonicifolia is a branching shrub up to 90 cm (36 inches) tall. The plant produces several small flower heads with purple disc florets but no ray florets.

References

External links
photo of specimen at Missouri Botanical Garden, collected in New Mexico, isotype of Coleosanthus betonicifolius/Brickellia betonicifolia
Vascular Plants of the Gila Wilderness

betonicifolia
Flora of Northwestern Mexico
Flora of the Southwestern United States
Plants described in 1853